Bağbanlar is a mahallah (district) in Ganja, Azerbaijan. Bagbanlar was constituted as an urban-type settlement in 1946. In 1963 the Bangbanlar urban-type settlement was merged into the city of Kirovabad (i.e. present-day Ganja).

References
 

Populated places in Azerbaijan
Ganja, Azerbaijan